Fate/stay night is an anime based on the visual novel Fate/stay night by Type-Moon. The episodes are directed by Yūji Yamaguchi, animated by Studio Deen and produced by the Fate Project, which included Geneon Entertainment, TBS, CREi, Type-Moon and Frontier Works Inc. The story of the series is primarily based on the Fate storyline in the Fate/stay night visual novel, although certain elements of the other two storylines, Unlimited Blade Works and Heaven's Feel, are incorporated into the plot.

The episodes were originally aired from January 7 to June 17, 2006, in Japan on Television Saitama and at later dates on CTC, KBS, tvk, Tokyo MX, Sun TV, TV Aichi and AT-X. The series later received its international television premieres on the anime television network Animax in 2007, also receiving its English-language television premiere on Animax's English networks in Southeast Asia from June 2007, as well as its other networks in South Korea, Hong Kong and other regions.

Five pieces of theme music are used for the episodes: two opening themes and three ending themes. Episode fourteen featured Jyukai's  and episode twenty-four played Sachi Tainaka's .

Eight DVD compilations, each containing three episodes, have been released by Type-Moon in Japan. The first of these compilations ranked number five on the Oricon listing charts as of April 5, 2006. Geneon Entertainment has released six DVD compilations, each containing four episodes, in North America, with the sixth released on October 9, 2007. The original soundtrack for the episodes, containing forty tracks of music, was also released by Geneon Entertainment on January 16, 2007.


Episode list

See also

List of Fate/stay night characters

References

External links
Official website 

 
Fate stay night